Topography of Croatia is defined through three major geomorphological parts of the country. Those are the Pannonian Basin, the Dinaric Alps, and the Adriatic Basin. Bulk of the lowlands are found in the northern regions of the country, especially in Slavonia, itself a part of the Pannonian Basin plain. The plains are interspersed by the horst and graben structures, believed to break the Pannonian Sea surface as islands. The greatest concentration of ground at relatively high elevations is found in Lika and Gorski Kotar areas in the Dinaric Alps, but such areas are found in all regions of Croatia to some extent. Karst topography makes up about half of Croatia and is especially prominent in the Dinaric Alps, as well as throughout the coastal areas and the islands.

Geomorphological units
Bulk of the lowlands are found in the northern regions of the country, especially in Slavonia, representing a part of the Pannonian Basin. The greatest concentration of ground at relatively high elevations is found in Lika and Gorski Kotar areas in the Dinaric Alps, but such areas are found in all regions of Croatia to some extent. The Pannonian Basin and the Dinaric Alps, along with the Adriatic Basin represent major geomorphological parts of Croatia.

Adriatic Basin

The number of islands includes all islands, islets, and rocks of all sizes, including ones emerging at ebb tide only. The islands include 48 permanently inhabited ones, the most populous among them being Krk and Korčula.

The shore is the most indented coastline in the Mediterranean. The majority of the coast is characterised by a karst topography, developed from the Adriatic Carbonate Platform. It is estimated that some karst formations are related to earlier immersions, most notably the Messinian salinity crisis. The largest part of the eastern coast consists of carbonate rocks, while flysch is significantly represented in the Gulf of Trieste coast, on the Kvarner Gulf coast opposite Krk, and in Dalmatia north of Split. There are comparably small alluvial areas of the Adriatic coast in Croatia—most notably the Neretva Delta. In the Middle Adriatic Basin, there is evidence of Permian volcanism observed in area of Komiža on the island of Vis and as volcanic islands of Jabuka and Brusnik.

Dinaric Alps

Formation of the Dinaric Alps is linked to a Late Jurassic to recent fold and thrust belt, itself a part of Alpine orogeny, extending southeast from the southern Alps. The Dinaric Alps in Croatia encompass the entire Gorski Kotar and Lika regions, as well as considerable parts of Dalmatia, with their northeastern edge running from  Žumberak to Banovina region, along the Sava River, and their westernmost landforms being  Ćićarija and  Učka mountains in Istria. The Dinaric Alps contain the highest mountain in Croatia— Dinara, as well as all other mountains in Croatia higher than —Biokovo, Velebit, Plješivica, Velika Kapela, Risnjak, Svilaja and Snježnik.

Karst topography makes up about half of Croatia and is especially prominent in the Dinaric Alps.

Pannonian Basin

The Pannonian Basin took shape through Miocenian thinning and subsidence of crust structures formed during Late Paleozoic Variscan orogeny. The Paleozoic and Mesozoic structures are visible in Papuk and other Slavonian mountains. The processes also led to formation of a stratovolcanic chain in the basin 17 – 12 Mya and intensified subsidence observed until 5 Mya as well as flood basalts about 7.5 Mya. Contemporary uplift of the Carpathian Mountains severed water flow to the Black Sea and Pannonian Sea formed in the basin. Sediment were transported to the basin from uplifting Carpathian and Dinaric mountains, with particularly deep fluvial sediments being deposited in the Pleistocene during uplift of the Transdanubian Mountains.

The results of those processes are large plains in the eastern Slavonia, Baranya and Syrmia, as well as in river valleys, especially along Sava, Drava and Kupa. The plains are interspersed by the horst and graben structures, believed to break the Pannonian Sea surface as islands.  The tallest among such landforms are  Ivanšćica and  Medvednica north of Zagreb and in Hrvatsko Zagorje as well as  Psunj and  Papuk which are the tallest among the Slavonian mountains surrounding Požega. Psunj, Papuk and adjacent Krndija consist mostly of Paleozoic rocks which are 350 – 300 million years old. Požeška gora, adjacent to Psunj, consists of much more recent Neogene rocks, but there are also Upper Cretaceous sediments and igneous rocks forming the main,  ridge of the hill and representing the largest igneous landform in Croatia. A smaller igneous landform is also present on Papuk, near Voćin. The two, as well as Moslavačka gora are possible remnants of a volcanic arc related to uplifting of the Dinaric Alps.

See also

 Geography of Croatia

References

Geography of Croatia